Brian McAlinden (born 1954/1955) is an Irish Gaelic footballer who played as the goalkeeper in the 1977 All-Ireland Senior Football Championship Final. He was the first goalkeeper who ever placed kickouts.

Playing career
McAlinden played for the Sarsfields Football Club. He was placed in goal one day while still young, having played as an outfielder earlier. He was the reserve goalkeeper, then he was placed in goal following the retirement of the first choice keeper. 

McAlinden made his inter-county debut in 1975 and played on until 1990. Peter Makem introduced him to the inter-county set-up. His first game was against Longford in a challenge match; Longford beat Armagh, with McAlinden letting in four or five goals in an unexpected result. He was in the team in 1977 when they won the Ulster Senior Football Championship (SFC) final, the first for 24 years, in the process ending Derry's ambitions of achieving a three-in-a-row run of title wins. Then they faced Roscommon in the 1977 All-Ireland Senior Football Championship (SFC) semi-final, a game which went to a replay, which McAlinden's team won, sending them into the 1977 All-Ireland SFC Final. McAlinden made a save from John O'Gara that led him to receive an award for Save of the Season. But Dublin, opponent in the final, won that game.

McAlinden would win three Ulster SFC titles before he finished playing, deciding to hang up his gloves one day in 1990. It was after Donegal had beaten them in the Ulster SFC final and his fellow Brian (Canavan) also retired that day.

Apart from his inter-county and club involvement, McAlinden played for Ulster in the Railway Cup along with Nudie Hughes. He played for Ireland in the International Rules Series. He played once for Glenavon against Larne in the Irish League, a game in which his team were defeated by a score of 4–2. He was named as the fourth greatest footballer never to have received an All Star Award. McAlinden was a superstitious man, a peculiarity that affected him during his time as a player, since he always sat in the same part of the dressing room (second seat from just inside the door). He also constantly wore two sets of socks (in both summer and winter weather) and made sure to put his right foot into his boot first and his left in second.

Managerial career
Straight away after stopping playing McAlinden went into management with Sarsfields. Though he was getting involved with what was then a Division 2 club, McAlinden was determined that they would win an Armagh Senior Football Championship title, even though the club had never even been in a final. He succeeded. He quit the role at the end of 1995.

Then he was appointed joint-manager of his county team from 1995 until 2001, with the help of Brian Canavan. They were known as "The Two Brians". Canavan was asked first but would only accept if McAlinden was alongside him. McAlinden was not keen to be involved so soon after finishing with Sarsfields, but Canavan was a close friend so he accepted.

They travelled about learning from people such as Ger Loughnane (in Ennis) and Larry Tompkins (in Cork) and went to Glasgow to see what they could find out from Celtic manager Martin O'Neill (who let them train with the team at Barrowfield) and also went for the then Rangers manager Dick Advocaat to see if they could learn anything from him.

It was during this time that Armagh defeated Down in the 1999 Ulster SFC Final. When victory was assured, Oisín McConville tried and chipped Down keeper Mickey McVeigh and  McVeigh collected the ball in his arms. McAlinden was furious at McConville for his piece of showmanship and had an argument with him afterwards. The win, though, meant they had a game at Croke Park; Armagh lost, however.

Armagh won another Ulster SFC title in 2000, achieving back-to-back title wins. Armagh faced Derry in the final, managed by another of McAlinden's friends, Eamonn Coleman. When he discovered Coleman always liked the dressing room on the left side of St Tiernach's Park, McAlinden put a plot together to get it off him. McAlinden said: "We went up on the Saturday before the final for a dry run. I got talking to the groundsman. I gave him 20 quid and asked him to put our name on the dressing room on the left-hand side and keep the door locked until we arrived on the Sunday. I said: 'See me after the match and I'll give you another 20'". Armagh landed at St Tiernach's Park and the door was locked, with Derry there before them trying to get in. Coleman objected to McAlinden and McAlinden pointed out that their name was on the door. The Armagh GAA chairman suggested they head to the opposing dressing room instead, but both Brians stood their ground. There were punches and then when the door opened Armagh took the room off Derry. McAlinden said this was when "the nice-guy thing had gone". Derry then lost the game as Armagh won the final. But after losing out to Kerry in the 2000 All-Ireland SFC semi-final the squad voted to get rid of the Two Brians but the Two Brians stayed on.

Armagh won the 2002 All-Ireland SFC title, but McAlinden and Canavan were no longer managing the team at that stage. They resigned in August 2001. The story of the Two Brians was documented in Kings for a Day by Niall McCoy. He returned in later years to help out as a goalkeeping coaching with Paul Grimley and Kieran McGeeney when they were managers. He also managed underage teams in Armagh. He received offers to manage other clubs and inter-county sides but refused them all because of his intimacy with Sarsfields and Armagh.

Personal life
McAlinden grew up in the village of Derrytrasna, close to Lurgan. He has had a kitchen company in Derrytrasna since 1978. He is married with children. His son Thomas won an All Ireland Minor Championship medal in 2009 when he was playing for Armagh.

References

1950s births
Living people
Armagh inter-county Gaelic footballers
Gaelic footballers who switched code
Gaelic football goalkeepers
Gaelic football goalkeeping coaches
Gaelic football managers
Irish international rules football players